The Emilia-Romagna regional election of 1980 took place on 8 June 1980.

The Italian Communist Party was by far the largest party, with almost two times the votes of Christian Democracy. After the election Lanfranco Turci, the incumbent Communist President of the Region, formed a new government with the support of the Italian Socialist Party.

Results

Elections in Emilia-Romagna
1980 elections in Italy